Cristina Raines (née Herazo; born February 28, 1952) is an American former actress and model who appeared in numerous films throughout the 1970s, mainly horror films and period pieces. She went on to have a prolific career as a television actress throughout the 1980s.

Born in Manila, Philippines to American parents, Raines was primarily raised in Florida. After graduating high school, she relocated to New York City to pursue a career as a model, and signed with the Ford Modeling Agency. Urged by Eileen Ford to audition for acting roles, Raines was subsequently cast as a lead in the independent horror film Hex (1973), opposite Keith Carradine and Scott Glenn. She had a minor part in the Charles Bronson thriller The Stone Killer, followed by a lead in the television film Sunshine, in which she played a young mother with terminal cancer.

In 1975, Raines was cast in a supporting role in Robert Altman's ensemble comedy Nashville, portraying a folk singer, followed by a lead in the supernatural horror film The Sentinel (1977), in which she starred as a model tormented by supernatural goings-on in her new apartment building. Raines also co-starred in Ridley Scott's directorial debut, The Duellists (1977), a period piece based on the Napoleonic Wars.

Raines had her first major television role in the twelve-part miniseries Centennial (1978), playing the daughter of a fur trapper in 1800s Colorado. Raines continued to act throughout the 1980s, with such film credits as the anthology horror film Nightmares (1983). She spent the majority of the decade acting in television, notably with a lead role on the NBC series Flamingo Road (1980–1982). In both this and Centennial, she played a love interest of the characters played by Mark Harmon. She appeared as Poppea in the miniseries Quo Vadis? in 1985, followed by guest-starring roles on Riptide (1985), Hotel (1987), Highway to Heaven (1988) and The Highwaymen (1988). In 1991, she formally retired from acting and pursued a career as a nurse, specializing in patients undergoing kidney dialysis.

Life and career

1952–1970: Early life
Raines was born February 28, 1952, in Manila, Philippines to American parents. Her father, Pedro Nel Herazo, was a chemical engineer who managed the Far East operations of Procter & Gamble, while her mother, Shirley Mae Herazo, worked as a dressmaker. Raines is one of five daughters. Her paternal grandfather was an immigrant from Colombia and her paternal grandmother was of Swedish and German ancestry, while her mother is of Scotch-Irish descent. Her sister Victoria Herazo was a member of the US Olympic team for racewalking.

Raines lived in various places due to her father's work: In her early childhood, she resided with her family in Venezuela, before spending the majority of her childhood in Coral Gables, Florida. She graduated high school in Boston, Massachusetts, and there subsequently attended the Chandler School for Women, a business college, where she trained to work as a secretary. Following her graduation from high school, Raines considered becoming a veterinarian and was accepted into a veterinary school, but decided to forgo the acceptance after her uncle, an advertising executive, suggested she work as a model due to her tall and slim figure.

1971–1979: Modeling and acting
Around 1970, Raines relocated to New York City, where she signed a modeling contract with Ford Models. The company's executive, Eileen Ford, felt that Raines had the potential to be an actress, and urged her to attend local auditions. Raines was reluctant but eventually acquiesced to Ford's pressure, auditioning for a lead role in the period piece horror film Hex (1973), opposite Keith Carradine and Gary Busey. Billed as Tina Herazo, she portrayed a Native American woman whose sister curses a gang of motorcyclists. Raines and Carradine began dating during the making of the film, which was shot in South Dakota in the fall of 1971. The couple went on to have a long-term relationship that lasted until 1979. Raines later commented that in her early career, agents often tried to cast her in Spanish-speaking roles due to her Hispanic features and Spanish surname, though Raines was not fluent in Spanish. This served as an impetus for her to alter her surname to expand her casting opportunities in film: "If you were born Cristina Herazo and went into films, wouldn't you change it?" she commented in 1983. "I had to find another name in a hurry, looked out of the window and it was raining. There it was. Raines."

Her next film appearance was a minor role portraying the daughter of Charles Bronson's character in the thriller The Stone Killer (1973), directed by Michael Winner, before she was cast in Joseph Sargent's biographical television film Sunshine (1973), in which she portrayed a 20-year-old mother who receives a terminal cancer diagnosis. She subsequently had a supporting part as a folk singer in Robert Altman's ensemble comedy Nashville (1975). Around this time, Raines signed a contract with Universal Pictures, and appeared in several films for the studio, though she later admitted that the contract "became very detrimental" to her career, and prevented her from doing numerous films. She reunited with director Michael Winner to appear in his supernatural horror film The Sentinel (1977), followed by a lead role in Ridley Scott's directorial debut The Duellists (also 1977), in which she co-starred with Carradine, and which focused on soldiers during the Napoleonic Wars. She subsequently co-starred as a central character in the 1978 television miniseries Centennial. Based on a novel by James Michener, the program was a 26-hour epic depicting the history of Colorado and is one of the first groundbreaking miniseries' created for television. Raines' role was that of Lucinda McKeag Zendt, an Arapaho and French-Canadian woman.

In 1979, Raines and Carradine separated, and she went on to star in the British motor-racing film Silver Dream Racer (1980) opposite Beau Bridges, and the drama Touched by Love (also 1980), co-starring with Diane Lane. From 1980 to 1982, she portrayed Lane Ballou, an exotic dancer and the mistress of a deputy in the NBC series Flamingo Road. Raines later appeared as a woman pursued by a killer in the anthology film Nightmares (1983) for Universal, originally slated to be a television series. In 1984, she starred opposite Rupert Everett in the comedy-drama film Real Life.

1985–present: leaves acting for nursing
Raines continued to appear in television, with guest-starring roles on Murder, She Wrote, The Love Boat, and Riptide. In 1985, she starred as Poppaea in the international miniseries Quo Vadis?, based on Henryk Sienkiewicz's 1896 novel of the same name. In 1986, she married writer and producer Christopher Crowe; together, the couple has two children. Raines' final feature film credit was in the surfing-themed drama North Shore (1987). She formally retired from acting in 1991, and became a registered nurse, specializing in patients undergoing kidney dialysis.

Filmography

Film

Television

References

Sources

External links

1952 births
Actresses from Florida
American women nurses
American film actresses
American television actresses
American people of Colombian descent
American people of German descent
American people of Scotch-Irish descent
American people of Swedish descent
Female models from Florida
Hispanic and Latino American actresses
Living people
People from Coral Gables, Florida
People from Manila
21st-century American women